Credit Suisse Group AG is a global investment bank  and financial services firm founded and based in Switzerland. Headquartered in Zürich, it maintains offices in all major financial centers around the world and is one of the nine global "bulge bracket" banks providing services in investment banking, private banking, asset management, and shared services. It is known for strict bank–client confidentiality and banking secrecy. The Financial Stability Board considers it to be a global systemically important bank. Credit Suisse is also a primary dealer and Forex counterparty of the Federal Reserve in the United States. 

Credit Suisse was founded in 1856 to fund the development of Switzerland's rail system. It issued loans that helped create Switzerland's electrical grid and the European rail system. In the 1900s, it began shifting to retail banking in response to the elevation of the middle class and competition from fellow Swiss banks UBS and Julius Bär. Credit Suisse partnered with First Boston in 1978 before buying a controlling share of the bank in 1988. From 1990 to 2000, the company purchased institutions such as Winterthur Group, Swiss Volksbank, Swiss American Securities Inc. (SASI), and Bank Leu. The biggest institutional shareholders of Credit Suisse include the Saudi National Bank (9.88%), the Qatar Investment Authority and BlackRock (about 5% each), Dodge & Cox, Norges Bank and the Saudi Olayan Group.

The company was one of the least affected banks during the global financial crisis, but afterwards began shrinking its investment business, executing layoffs and cutting costs. The bank was at the center of multiple international investigations for tax avoidance which culminated in a guilty plea and the forfeiture of US$2.6 billion in fines from 2008 to 2012.

UBS announced its intent to acquire Credit Suisse for $3.25 billion (CHF 3 billion) on March 19, 2023.

Corporate structure

Credit Suisse Group AG, is organised as a joint-stock company registered in Zürich that operates as a holding company. It owns the Credit Suisse bank and other interests in the financial services business. Credit Suisse is governed by a board of directors, its shareholders, and independent auditors. The Board of Directors organise the annual General Meeting of Shareholders while investors with large stakes in the company determine the agenda. Shareholders elect auditors for one-year terms, approve the annual report and other financial statements, and have other powers granted by law. Shareholders elect members of the board of directors to serve a three-year term based on candidates nominated by the Chairman's and Governance Committee and the Board of Directors meet six times a year to vote on company resolutions. The Board sets Credit Suisse's business strategies and approves its compensation (remuneration) principles based on guidance from the compensation committee. It also has the authority to create committees that delegate specific management functions.

Credit Suisse has two divisions, Private Banking & Wealth Management and Investment Banking. A Shared Services department provides support functions like risk management, legal, IT, and marketing to all areas. Operations are divided into four regions: Switzerland, Europe, the Middle East, and Africa, the Americas, and the Asian Pacific. Credit Suisse Private Banking has wealth management, corporate and institutional businesses. Credit Suisse Investment Banking handles securities, investment research, trading, prime brokerage, and capital procurement. Credit Suisse Asset Management sells investment classes, alternative investments, real-estate, equities, fixed income products, and other financial products.

Ownership 
In August 2022, it was revealed that the first shareholder of Credit Suisse is in fact American, namely Harris Associates, holding over 10% of the shares of the group. Harris Associates itself is owned by French bank Natixis.

As of January 25, 2023, Saudi National Bank an anchor investor holds 10 per cent stake, Qatar Investment Authority (QIA) boosted its stake in the Credit Suisse Group to 6.87 per cent and Harris Associates reported a holding of below 3 per cent. Harris Associates reported having exited all its Credit Suisse positions by March 2023. Credit Suisse stock (CS) in the NYSE fell from $2.50 to $1.88 a share on Wednesday March 15th, 2023.

On 19 March 2023, fellow Swiss bank group UBS agreed to buy Credit Suiss for more than 2 billion USD.

History

Early history

Credit Suisse's founder, Alfred Escher, was called "the spiritual father of the railway law of 1852", for his work defeating the idea of a state-run railway system in Switzerland in favor of privatization. Escher founded Credit Suisse (originally called the Swiss Credit Institution, i.e., Schweizerische Kreditanstalt) jointly with Allgemeine Deutsche Credit-Anstalt in 1856 primarily to provide domestic funding to railway projects, avoiding French banks that wanted to exert influence over the railway system. Escher aimed to start the company with three million shares and instead sold 218 million shares in three days. The bank was modeled after Crédit Mobilier, a bank funding railway projects in France that was founded two years prior, except Credit Suisse had a more conservative lending policy focused on short-to-medium term loans. In its first year of operation, 25 percent of the bank's revenues was from the Swiss Northeastern Railway, which was being built by Escher's company, Nordostbahn. 

Credit Suisse played a substantial role in the economic development of Switzerland, helping the country develop its currency system, funding entrepreneurs and investing in the Gotthard railway, which connected Switzerland to the European rail system in 1882. Credit Suisse helped fund the creation of Switzerland's electrical grid through its participation with Elektrobank (now called Elektrowatt), a coalition of organizations that co-financed Switzerland's electrical grid. According to The Handbook on the History of European Banks, "Switzerland's young electricity industry came to assume the same importance as support for railway construction 40 years earlier." The bank also helped fund the effort to disarm and imprison French troops that crossed into Swiss borders in the 1870 Franco-Prussian War. By the end of the war, Credit Suisse had become the largest bank in Switzerland.

Throughout the late 1800s, Credit Suisse set up banking and insurance companies in Germany, Brussels, Geneva and others (as SKA International) with the bank as a shareholder of each company. It created insurance companies like Swiss RE, Swiss Life (aka Rentenanstalt) and Schweiz. Credit Suisse had its first unprofitable year in 1886, due to losses in agriculture, venture investments, commodities, and international trade. The bank created its own sugar beet factory, bought 25,000 shares in animal breeding ventures and supported an export business, Schweizerische Exportgesellschaft, that experienced heavy losses for over-speculative investing.

In the early 1900s Credit Suisse began catering to consumers and the middle-class with deposit counters, currency exchanges and savings accounts. The first branch outside of Zürich was opened in 1905 in Basel. The bank helped companies affected by World War I restructuring, and extended loans for reconstruction efforts. During the 1920s depression, net profits and dividends were halved and employees took salary cuts. After World War II, a substantial portion of Credit Suisse's business was in foreign reconstruction efforts. Banks subsequently acquired by Credit Suisse have been linked to bank accounts used by members of the NSDAP in the 1930s. Holocaust survivors had problems trying to retrieve assets from relatives that died in concentration camps without death certificates. This led to a class action lawsuit in 1996 that settled in 2000 for $1.25 billion. The Agreement on the Swiss Banks' Code of Conduct with Regard to the Exercise of Due Diligence was created in the 1970s, after a Credit Suisse branch in Chiasso was exposed for illegally funneling $900 million in Italian deposits to speculative investments.

Acquisitions, growth and First Boston

In 1978, White, Weld & Company dropped its partnership with Credit Suisse after it was bought by Merrill Lynch. To replace the partnership with White, Credit Suisse partnered with First Boston to create Credit Suisse First Boston in Europe and bought a 44 percent stake in First Boston's US operations.

In 1987, the Group acquired the blue chip London stockbrokers Buckmaster & Moore. Originally established by aristocrat Charles Armytage-Moore and sportsman Walter Buckmaster, who had met at Repton School. As stockbrokers they were very well connected, had developed a good private client business, which at one time included John Maynard Keynes.

Other Credit Suisse First Boston brands were later created in Switzerland, Asia, London, New York and Tokyo. According to an article in The New York Times, First Boston became "the superstar of the Euromarkets" by buying stakes in American companies that wanted to issue bonds. In 1988 First Boston loaned $487 million to Gibbons and Green for the purchase of the Ohio Mattress Company, which was purchased at twenty times its annual revenue. Gibbons had also borrowed $475 million in junk bonds. When the junk bonds market crashed the following year, Gibbons couldn't repay First Boston. Credit Suisse injected $725 million to keep First Boston in business, which ultimately led to the company being taken over by Credit Suisse. This became known as the "burning bed" deal, because the Federal Reserve overlooked the Glass–Steagall Act that requires separation between commercial and investment banks in order to preserve the stability of the financial markets.

In the late 1990s, Credit Suisse executed an aggressive acquisition strategy. The bank acquired Bank Leu, known as Switzerland's oldest bank, in 1990. In 1993 Credit Suisse outbid UBS for a controlling stake in Switzerland's fifth largest bank, Swiss Volksbank in a $1.1 billion deal. It also merged with Winterthur Group in 1997 for about $9 billion and acquired the asset management division of Warburg, Pincus & Co. in 1999 for $650 million. Donaldson, Lufkin & Jenrette was purchased for $11.5 billion in 2000.

In 1996, Credit Suisse restructured as the Credit Suisse Group with four divisions: Credit Suisse Volksbank (later called Credit Suisse Bank) for domestic banking, Credit Suisse Private Banking, Credit Suisse Asset Management, and Credit Suisse First Boston for corporate and investment banking. The restructure was expected to cost the company $800 million and result in 7,000 lost jobs, but save $560 million a year. While Credit Suisse First Boston had been struggling, Credit Suisse's overall profits had grown 20 percent over the prior year, reaching $664 million. In 1999 Japan's Financial Supervisory Agency temporarily suspended the financial-products division's license to operate in Japan for "window dressing", the practice of selling derivatives that are often used by bank clients to hide losses.

In the 2000s, Credit Suisse executed a series of restructures. In 2002 the bank was consolidated into two entities: Credit Suisse First Boston for investments and Credit Suisse Financial Services. A third unit was added in 2004 for insurance. Credit Suisse restructured again in 2004 under what it calls the "one bank" model. Under the restructuring, every board had a mix of executives from all three divisions. It also changed the compensation and commission models to encourage cross-division referrals and created a "solution partners" group that functions between the investment and private banking divisions. Following the restructure Credit Suisse's private banking division grew 19 percent per year despite the economic crisis. The firm bumped long-time rival UBS off the number one position in Euromoney's private banking poll. In 2006, Credit Suisse acknowledged misconduct for helping Iran and other countries hide transactions from US authorities and paid a $536 million settlement. The same year it merged Bank Leu AG, Clariden Holding AG, Bank Hofmann AG and BGP Banca di Gestione Patrimoniale into a new company called Clariden Leu.

The increasing importance of sustainability and the related commitments and liabilities of international standards such as the UNGC, of which the bank is a member, lead to increasingly sophisticated and ambitious risk management over the years. Credit Suisse operates a process which since 2007 uses RepRisk, a Swiss provider of ESG Risk analytics and metrics, to screen and evaluate environmental and social risks of risky transactions and due diligence.

In 2009, Yellowstone Club founder Tim Blixseth sued Credit Suisse when the bank attempted to collect on $286 million in loan debt during Yellowstone's bankruptcy proceedings. The debtor had borrowed more than $300 million for the business, but used a large portion of it for personal use before eventually filing for bankruptcy. Four lawsuits were filed from other resorts seeking $24 billion in damages alleging Credit Suisse created loans with the intention of taking over their properties upon default.

Post-financial crisis
According to The Wall Street Journal in 2008, "Credit Suisse survived the credit crisis better than many competitors." Credit Suisse had $902 million in writedowns for subprime holdings and the same amount for leveraged loans, but it did not have to borrow from the government. Along with other banks, Credit Suisse was investigated and sued by US authorities in 2012 for bundling mortgage loans with securities, misrepresenting the risks of underlying mortgages during the housing boom. Following the crisis, Credit Suisse cut more than one-trillion in assets and made plans to cut its investment banking arm 37 percent by 2014. It reduced emphasis on investment banking and focused on private banking and wealth management. In July 2011, Credit Suisse cut 2,000 jobs in response to a weaker than expected economic recovery and later merged its asset management with the private bank group to cut additional costs.

A series of international investigations took place in the early 2000s regarding the use banking secrecy in Credit Suisse accounts for tax evasion. In 2008, the Brazilian government investigated 13 former and current Credit Suisse employees. The investigation led to arrests that year and in 2009 as part of a larger crackdown in Brazil. Four Credit Suisse bankers were accused of fraud by the US Justice Department in 2011 for helping wealthy Americans avoid taxes. In 2012, German authorities found that citizens were using insurance policies of a Bermuda-based Credit Suisse subsidiary to earn tax-free interest. In November 2012, Credit Suisse's asset management division was merged with the private banking arm. In September 2012, the Swiss government gave banks like Credit Suisse permission to provide information to the US Justice Department for tax evasion probes. In February 2014, it agreed to pay a fine of $197 million after one of its businesses served 8,500 US clients without registering its activities, leading to suspicion as to whether it was helping Americans evade taxes. It was one of 14 Swiss banks under investigation. Separately, in 2013, German authorities began to probe Credit Suisse, its private bank subsidiary Clariden Leu, and its regional subsidiary Neue Aargauer Bank for helping German citizens evade taxes. In 2012, the bank eventually entered into a €150 million settlement with the government.

In March 2014, Credit Suisse denied claims it had been drawn into a Swiss competition probe investigating potential collusion to manipulate foreign exchange rates (Forex scandal) by various Swiss and foreign banks.
In May 2014, Credit Suisse pleaded guilty to conspiring to aid tax evasion. It was the most prominent bank to plead guilty in the United States since Drexel Burnham Lambert in 1989 and the largest to do so since the Bankers Trust in 1999. "Credit Suisse conspired to help U.S. citizens hide assets in offshore accounts in order to evade paying taxes. When a bank engages in misconduct this brazen, it should expect that the Justice Department will pursue criminal prosecution to the fullest extent possible, as has happened here," Attorney General Eric H. Holder said at the time. Holder also said "This case shows that no financial institution, no matter its size or global reach, is above the law." Credit Suisse shares rose 1% on the day the $2.6 billion penalty was announced.

In March 2015, it was announced that Tidjane Thiam, the CEO of Prudential would leave to become the next CEO of Credit Suisse. In September 2016, Brian Chin was appointed Chief Executive of Global Markets and joined the executive board of the bank. At this time, it was also announced that Eric M. Varvel was appointed president and CEO of Credit Suisse Holdings (USA).

As of 2018, share prices of Credit Suisse and other Swiss banks including UBS remained mostly stagnant or flat since the 2008 financial crisis. This is seen as a result of the aftermath of the collapse of Lehman Brothers, which caused a large loss in consumer and market participant trust and confidence in the banking industry. The loss in confidence is reflected in the large loss of share prices across the Swiss banking sector after 2008, which have not recovered to pre-financial crisis levels.

In August 2019, Credit Suisse announced the formation of a new "direct banking" business unit under their Switzerland division (Swiss Universal Bank, SUB), focusing on digital retail products. The step is seen as a reaction to the emergence of FinTech competitors such as N26 or Revolut in Switzerland and shall help to better attract young clients. In July 2020, Thomas Gottstein, the new CEO of the company, announced restructuring; it was influenced as a result of the trading surge in Q2 of 2020, amid the COVID-19 pandemic. The planned restructuring is set "to reduce costs and improve efficiencies" and features some reverts of alterations brought by the previous CEO, Thiam. According to Gottstein, "These initiatives should also help to provide resilience in uncertain markets and deliver further upside when more positive economic conditions prevail."

On 9 February 2023, the bank reported an annual loss of CHF 7.3 bn, the biggest loss since the 2008 global financial crisis. On 14 March of that same year, Credit Suisse published its annual report for 2022 saying it had identified “material weaknesses” in controls over financial reporting.

Collapse

On 15 March 2023, Credit Suisse' share price dropped nearly 25percent after Saudi National Bank, its largest investor, said it could not provide more financial assistance. The market price of the bank's unsecured bonds set for maturity in 2027 dropped to a low of 33percent of their par value on that day, down from being valued at 90percent of their par value at the beginning of the month.

Later in the same week, Credit Suisse sought to shore up their finances by taking a loan of 50 billion Swiss francs from the Swiss National Bank; the bank later proceeded to buy three billion Swiss francs of its own debt and to put the Baur en Ville hotel in Zürich for sale.
However, this intervention did not stop investors and customers from pulling their money out of Credit Suisse, with outflows topping 10 billion Swiss francs during the week. The situation was so compromised that the Swiss National Bank and the Swiss government started discussions to fast-track the bank's acquisition by UBS. On 19 March 2023, UBS announced a deal had been reached to acquire Credit Suisse for US$3.25billion in an all-stock deal.

Financial products

Credit Suisse endorses a strategy called bancassurance of trying to be a single company that offers every common financial services product. The investment bank is intended for companies and wealthy individuals with more than 50,000 euro.

Credit Suisse developed the CreditRisk+ model of risk assessment in loans, which is focused exclusively on the chance of default based on the exogenous Poisson method. As of 2002 about 20 percent of Credit Suisse's revenue was from its insurance business it gained through the 1997 acquisition of Winterthur. The investment bank's insurance products are primarily popular in the domestic market and include auto, fire, property, life, disability, pension and retirement products among others. Historically 20–40 percent of the bank's revenue has been from private banking services, one of its higher profit-margin divisions.

Credit Suisse produces one of the six hedge funds following European stock indices that are used to evaluate the performance of the markets. The investment bank also has a 30 percent ownership in hedge fund investment firm York Capital Management. York sells hedge funds independently to its own clients, while Credit Suisse also offers them to private banking clients. Credit Suisse manages the financial instruments of the Dow Jones Credit Suisse long/short equity index (originally called Credit Suisse/Tremont Hedge Fund Indexes).

According to a 2011 article in SeekingAlpha, Credit Suisse's investment managers favor financial, technology and energy sector stocks. The bank's head of equity investments in Europe said the team focuses on "value with an emphasis on free cashflow". She also has an interest in companies undergoing management changes that may influence the stock price. According to a story in The Wall Street Journal, the head of Credit Suisse's International Focus Fund keeps a portfolio of only 40–50 stocks, instead of the industry-norm of more than 100. Credit Suisse publishes its investment advice in four publications: Compass, Viewpoints, Research and the Credit Suisse Investment Committee Report.

Reputation and rankings
The reputation of the bank is controversial. From the 1940s until into the 2010s, beside regular customers, Credit Suisse offered criminals, corrupt politicians and controversial secret service chiefs a safe haven for their assets, despite all public declarations of a "white money" strategy.

As of 2012, Credit Suisse was a member of Wall Street's bulge bracket, a list of nine of the largest and most profitable banks. The company was one of the world's most important banks, upon which international financial stability depends. The bank was also one of Fortune Magazine's most admired companies.

As of 2004, Credit Suisse was first in volume of high-yield transactions, second for corporate high-yield bond insurance and third for IPO underwriting.
As of 2012, Credit Suisse was recognised as the world's best private bank by Euromoney Global Private Banking Survey and as the best European Equity Manager by Global Investors. In polls by Euromoney, it has been ranked as the top private bank and the best bank in Switzerland. in 1995, the Securities Data Company ranked Credit Suisse as the fourth best place for financial advice for mergers and acquisitions in the US and sixth for domestic equity issues. Credit Suisse was recognized by the Asset Triple A Awards and in 2005 it was ranked as the second best prime broker by Institutional Investor.

Controversies

Mismarking, 2007
In 2007, two Credit Suisse traders pleaded guilty to mismarking their securities positions to overvalue them by $3 billion, avoid losses, and increase their year-end bonuses. Federal prosecutors and the Securities and Exchange Commission charged that the traders' goal was to obtain lavish year-end bonuses that the mismarking would lead to. The traders engaged in what The New York Times called "a brazen scheme to artificially increase the price of bonds on their books to create fictitious profits". A team of traders, facing an inquiry from Credit Suisse's internal controls Price Testing group, justified their bond portfolio's inflated value by obtaining "independent" marks from other banks' trading desks.

The traders secured sham "independent" marks for illiquid securities that they held position in from friends who worked at other financial firms. Their friends generated prices that valued a number of bonds at the prices that the traders requested, which the traders then recorded as the true value of the bonds. The bank was not charged in the case. Credit Suisse's outside auditor discovered the mismarkings during an audit. Credit Suisse took a $2.65 billion write-down after discovering their traders' mismarking.

International Emergency Economic Powers Act and New York State Law violations, 2009
On 16 December 2009, it was announced that the U.S. Dept. of Justice reached a settlement with Credit Suisse over accusations that the bank assisted residents of International Emergency Economic Powers Act sanctioned countries to wire money in violation of the Act as well as New York law from 1995 to 2006. The settlement resulted in Credit Suisse forfeiting $536 million.

Forex manipulation, 2013
In 2013, Credit Suisse was fined €83.3 million for forex rates manipulation by the European Union Commission on Competition because of its participation in a cartel detrimental to E.U. consumers and involving several other large international banks.

U.S. tax fraud conspiracy, 2014 
In 2014, Credit Suisse pleaded guilty to conspiring with Americans to file false tax returns. Credit Suisse subsequently paid $2.6 billion in fines and restitution. It was reported in 2022 that the Department of Justice had opened an investigation into whether the bank continued to assist clients hide assets from tax authorities despite the terms of the 2014 settlement.

Malaysia Development Berhad scandal, 2015

In September 2015 Hong Kong police began investigations regarding $250 million in Credit Suisse branch deposits in Hong Kong linked to former Malaysia's Prime Minister Najib Razak and Malaysian sovereign wealth fund, 1Malaysia Development Berhad (1MDB). In 2017, Singapore fined Credit Suisse a total of S$0.7m (£0.4m, $0.5m, €0.45m). In May 2017, Reuters reported that "Swiss financial watchdog FINMA ... had conducted "extensive investigations" into Credit Suisse's dealings surrounding 1MDB". In 2019 FINMA issued a complaint to Credit Suisse.

Mozambique secret loans scandal, 2017
Between 2012 and 2016, Credit Suisse brokered US$1.3 billion of loans with Mozambican finance minister Manuel Chang, to develop the country's tuna fishing industry. The loans were issued as bonds to be paid off by the income from tuna fishing as well as the country's nascent natural gas industry. Chang lied to investors, his own government, the IMF and the banks issuing the loans, including Credit Suisse. Credit Suisse was fined almost US$500 million by UK, US and European regulators for a lack of transparency in the issuing of the bonds, for kickbacks benefitting Credit Suisse bankers and for enabling loans likely to be embezzled by Mozambican officials, including Chang. In October 2021, Credit Suisse pled guilty to wire fraud and agreed to forgive US$200 million in debt owed by Mozambique to the bank.

US Foreign Corrupt Practices Act violation, 2018 
On 5 July 2018, Credit Suisse agreed to pay a $47 million fine to the US Department of Justice and $30 million to resolve charges of the US Securities and Exchange Commission (SEC). The SEC's investigation said that the banking group sought banking-investment business in the Asia-Pacific region by hiring and promoting more than one hundred Chinese officials and related people in violation of the Foreign Corrupt Practices Act.

Climate controversy, 2018

In November 2018, about a dozen climate activists played tennis inside Credit Suisse agencies (of Lausanne, Geneva and Basel simultaneously), disrupting operations as a protest against the bank's investments in fossil fuels. Credit Suisse lodged a complaint and the activists from Lausanne were tried in January 2020 and fined 21,600 CHF. They were later cleared of all charges in what a Swiss media outlet considered a 'historical decision'.

The tennis theme was chosen to urge Swiss tennis star Roger Federer to break his connection with Credit Suisse as a sponsor due to the company's participating in the climate crisis (notably by multiplying 16-fold its financing for coal from 2016 to 2017). On 11 January 2020, Federer published a statement saying: "[...] I have a great deal of respect and admiration for the youth climate movement, and I am grateful to young climate activists for pushing us all to examine our behaviours", and further committed to a dialogue with his sponsors on social issues.

On 24 January 2020, following the trial, the climate activist group emitted a press statement requesting a transparent, televised debate with the CEO of Credit Suisse. With no answer from the bank, they created a website under the name "DiscreditSuisse" hosting content pertaining to Credit Suisse's record on climate issues.

Espionage scandal, 2019 
In 2019, a senior executive who was leaving the firm discovered that Pierre-Olivier Bouée, the chief operating officer (COO) of Credit Suisse at the time, had hired private detectives to follow him to see if he was wooing Credit Suisse clients. Bouée was fired, and a private investigator involved in the surveillance apparently killed himself.

Greensill Capital, 2021 

In March 2021, Credit Suisse closed and liquidated several supply-chain investment funds tied to the activities of Greensill Capital. The investors in the funds, which totalled assets of approximately $10 billion, were expected to lose $3 billion as of March 2021. Credit Suisse has returned around $5.9 billion to investors in its Greensill-linked funds.

Archegos Capital, 2021
In April 2021, at least seven executives were removed from their posts after Credit Suisse reported losses of $4.7 billion linked to its prime brokerage services provided to Archegos Capital. The executives who departed included Lara Warner, the group's chief risk and compliance officer, and Brian Chin, head of the investment bank. Just prior to Credit Suisse's 2021 Annual General Meeting, Andreas Gottschling, head of the board's risk committee, also stood down.

Drug money laundering scandal, 2022
On 7 February 2022, it was announced that Credit Suisse would be tried in the first criminal trial of a major bank in Switzerland. Swiss prosecutors are seeking around 42 million Swiss francs ($45 million) in compensation from Credit Suisse for allowing a Bulgarian cocaine trafficking gang around Evelin Banev to launder millions of Euros of cash between 2004 and 2008. On 27 June 2022, the bank as well as one of its former employees was found guilty by the Federal Criminal Court of Switzerland for not doing enough to prevent the crime from taking place. The bank said it would appeal against the verdict.

Suisse secrets leak, 2022

In February 2022, details of 30,000 customers holding over 100bn Swiss francs (£80bn) in accounts at the bank were leaked to the Süddeutsche Zeitung, and became known as "Suisse Secrets". Among those with accounts at the bank were a human trafficker, a torturer, drug traffickers and a Vatican-run account that allegedly invested €350m fraudulently in London property. On 20 February, Credit Suisse said it "strongly rejects" allegations of wrongdoing.

Russian oligarch loans documents destruction after invasion of Ukraine, 2022 
Following Swiss sanctions on Russia during the 2022 Russian invasion of Ukraine, Credit Suisse issued legal requests asking hedge funds and other investors to destroy documents linking Russian oligarchs to yacht loans, a move for which they faced considerable criticism. The US House Oversight Committee launched a probe into the firm demanding documents linked to the bank's compliance with sanctions on Russian oligarchs.

Social media rumours, 2022
In early October 2022, Credit Suisse stocks came under considerable pressure when rumours on social media projected the demise of the bank. According to financial analysts, the bank has a “strong capital base and liquidity position”. Nevertheless, the Swiss National Bank vowed to follow the situation closely. European finance experts in particular talked of a "self-fulfilling risk" since liquidity is not a problem for the Swiss bank. CS had suffered severe losses in 2021 from the Archegos and Greensill financial scandals that implicated former Archegos executives with racketeering conspiracy, securities fraud and wire fraud.

On 7 October 2022, the bank offered to buy back US$3 billion worth of debt, and put Zurich's Savoy Hotel on sale. The bank's current chairman, Axel Lehmann, also assured investors that the bank was stable after wealthy clients began moving their assets out of the bank. In the fall-out from the falling stock prices, insiders believed that Saudi prince Mohammed bin Salman was potentially looking to invest almost US$500 million into the bank.

Work environment
Credit Suisse is more internationally minded than most European banks. According to WetFeet's Insider Guide, Credit Suisse offers more travel opportunities, greater levels of responsibility and more client interaction than new employees get at competing firms but is known for long hours. Analysts report 60- to 110-hour work-weeks.

Roles and responsibilities are less stringent and the environment is pleasant despite hours being "the most grueling on Wall Street". Vault's Insider's Guide reached similar conclusions, noting above-average training, executive access and openness matched with reports of 80- to 100-hour work-weeks.

In 2023, the bank made moves to pay bonuses to top executives and senior bankers upfront but included an added condition that they needed to stay with the bank for three years or else they would need to pay the bonus, or some of the bonus, back to the company.

See also

Banco Garantia
European Financial Services Roundtable
First Boston Corporation
World Jewish Congress lawsuit against Swiss banks, 1995

References

External links

 
Companies based in Zürich
Banks established in 1856
Financial services companies established in 1856
1856 establishments in Switzerland
Holding companies established in 1856
Companies listed on the New York Stock Exchange
Banks based in Zürich
Systemically important financial institutions
Primary dealers
Companies formerly listed on the Tokyo Stock Exchange
Companies listed on the SIX Swiss Exchange
Holding companies of Switzerland
Multinational companies headquartered in Switzerland
Swiss brands
Investment management companies of Switzerland
Corporate scandals
Announced mergers and acquisitions